Nilkanth Halarnkar is an Indian politician. He was elected to the Goa Legislative Assembly from Tivim in the 2007 Goa Legislative Assembly election as a member of the Nationalist Congress Party and 2017 Goa Legislative Assembly election as a member of the Indian National Congress. He was one of the ten members of Indian National Congress who joined Bharatiya Janata Party in July 2019.

References

Goa MLAs 2022–2027
Living people
Nationalist Congress Party politicians from Goa
Former members of Indian National Congress from Goa
People from South Goa district
Goa MLAs 2017–2022
Year of birth missing (living people)
Bharatiya Janata Party politicians from Goa
Goa MLAs 2007–2012